The 1976 Copa del Generalísimo Final was the 74th final of the Spanish Cup. The final was played at Santiago Bernabéu Stadium in Madrid, on 26 June 1976, being won by Atlético Madrid, who beat Real Zaragoza 1–0.

It was the last final to be called the Copa del Generalísimo, following the death of Francisco Franco in November 1975. Since then, it has been called the Copa del Rey. The match was watched by King Juan Carlos I and the eight-year-old Prince of Asturias (later Felipe VI). Felipe became an Atlético fan after watching them win.

Details

References

1976
Copa
Atlético Madrid matches
Real Zaragoza matches